Dwayne Glenn McDuffie (February 20, 1962February 21, 2011) was an American writer of comic books and television, known for producing and writing the animated series Static Shock,  Damage Control, Justice League Unlimited and Ben 10, and co-founding the pioneering minority-owned-and-operated comic book company Milestone Media, which focused on underrepresented minorities in American comics.

McDuffie earned three Eisner Award nominations for his work in comics.

Early life and education
McDuffie was born and raised in Detroit, Michigan, the son of Leroy McDuffie and Edna (Hawkins) McDuffie Gardner. He attended and graduated from the Roeper School, a school for gifted children in Bloomfield Hills, Michigan, in 1980. Of African-American characters in comics, he later, said:

In 1983, he graduated with a bachelor's degree in English from the University of Michigan, followed by a master's degree in physics. He then moved to New York to attend film school at New York University's Tisch School of the Arts. While McDuffie was working as a copy editor at the business magazine Investment Dealers' Digest, a friend got him an interview for an assistant editor position at Marvel Comics. Posthumously, comedian Keegan-Michael Key discovered he was Dwayne McDuffie's biological half-brother, by their father.

Career

Marvel and Milestone
Going on staff at Marvel as editor Bob Budiansky's assistant on special projects, McDuffie helped develop the company's first superhero trading cards. He also scripted stories for Marvel. His first major work was Damage Control, a miniseries about the company that shows up between issues and tidies up the mess left by the latest round of superhero/supervillain battles.

After becoming an editor at Marvel, McDuffie submitted a spoof proposal for a comic entitled Teenage Negro Ninja Thrashers in response to Marvel's treatment of its black characters. Becoming a freelancer in 1990, McDuffie wrote for dozens of various comics titles for Marvel, DC Comics, and Archie Comics. In addition, he wrote Monster in My Pocket for Harvey Comics editor Sid Jacobson, whom he cites on his website as having taught him everything he knows. In early 1991, he divorced his first wife, Patricia D. Younger, in Seminole County, Florida.

In the early 1990s, wanting to express a multicultural sensibility that he felt was missing in comic books, McDuffie and three partners founded Milestone Media, which The Plain Dealer of Cleveland, Ohio, described in 2000 as "the industry's most successful minority-owned-and operated comic company." McDuffie explained:

Milestone, whose characters include the African-American Static, Icon, and Hardware; the Asian-American Xombi, and the multi-ethnic superhero group the Blood Syndicate, which include Black, Asian and Latino men and women, debuted its titles in 1993 through a distribution deal with DC Comics. Serving as editor-in-chief, McDuffie created or co-created many characters, including Static.

Movies, television, and video games
After Milestone had ceased publishing new comics, Static was developed into an animated series Static Shock.  McDuffie was hired to write and story-edit on the series, writing 11 episodes.

His other television writing credits included Teen Titans and What's New, Scooby-Doo?.

McDuffie was hired as a staff writer for the animated series Justice League and was promoted to story editor and producer as the series became Justice League Unlimited.  During the entire run of the animated series, McDuffie wrote, produced, or story-edited 69 out of the 91 episodes.

McDuffie also wrote the story for the video game Justice League Heroes.

McDuffie was hired to help revamp and story-edit Cartoon Network's popular animated Ben 10 franchise with Ben 10: Alien Force, continuing the adventures of the ten-year-old title character into his mid and late teenage years. During the run of the series, McDuffie wrote episodes 1–3, 14, 25–28, 45 and 46 and/or story-edited all forty-six episodes. McDuffie also produced and story edited for the second sequel series Ben 10: Ultimate Alien, which premiered April 23. 2010. He wrote episodes 1, 10, 11, 16, 30, 39 together with J. M. DeMatteis and 52.

McDuffie wrote a number of direct-to-DVD animated films featuring DC Comics characters – including Justice League: Crisis on Two Earths and Justice League: Doom. He scripted the direct-to-DVD adaptation of All-Star Superman, which was released one day after his death. Justice League: Doom was released posthumously in 2012.

McDuffie's work was also seen on Ben 10: Omniverse, having shared story by credit on the first two episodes, "The More Things Change, Parts 1 and 2."

Return to comics
After his popular work in Justice League and Justice League Unlimited, McDuffie returned to writing comic books.  He wrote the Marvel miniseries Beyond!.

In 2007, McDuffie wrote several issues of Firestorm for DC Comics, starting in January through to its cancellation. Later that year, he became the regular writer on Fantastic Four, scripting issues #542–553 (cover-dated Dec. 2006 March 2008). As well, he wrote Justice League of America vol. 2, writing virtually every issue from #13–34 (Nov. 2007 – Aug. 2009). He was fired from that series following a Lying in the Gutters compilation of his frank answers to fans about the creative process.

He married comic book and animation-TV writer Charlotte Fullerton in 2009.

McDuffie wrote Milestone Forever for DC Comics, a two-issue, squarebound miniseries chronicling the final adventures of his Milestone characters before a catastrophic event that fuses their continuity with the continuity of the DC Universe.

Death
On February 21, 2011, one day after his 49th birthday, McDuffie died at Providence Saint Joseph Medical Center in Burbank, California, of complications from emergency heart surgery.

Tributes
The 2012 film Justice League: Doom was dedicated to the memory of Dwayne McDuffie, and the Blu-ray and 2-Disc DVD editions of the film included the documentary, A Legion of One: The Dwayne McDuffie Story.  That same year, a diner named "McDuffie's" was depicted in the Green Lantern: The Animated Series episode "The New Guy".

In 2012, the Ultimate Spider-Man episode "Damage" was dedicated in memory of Dwayne McDuffie. In the episode, a new character named "Mac" was introduced as the CEO of the Damage Control, the fictional company created by McDuffie.

Also in 2012, the Ben 10: Ultimate Alien final episode "The Ultimate Enemy: Part 2", the crew of the series dedicated the episode in his memory in the credits. The same tribute appeared in the racing video game based on the series, Ben 10: Galactic Racing.

In the 2011 Static Shock comics series, Virgil Hawkins' new high school is named after McDuffie.

In 2015, the Long Beach Comic Expo gave out the first Dwayne McDuffie Award for Diversity in Comics. It has since become an annual event for the expo.

The Dwayne McDuffie Award for Kids' Comics is given out each year at the Ann Arbor Comic Arts Festival.

In 2019, the DC Comics character Naomi’s last name was revealed to be McDuffie.

Awards and nominations 
In 1995, McDuffie received Eisner Award nominees for Best Writer (for Icon), Best Editor (for Worlds Collide, Xombi, and Shadow Cabinet), and Best Continuing Series (with M.D. Bright for Icon)
In 1996, McDuffie won the Golden Apple Award from his alma mater the Roeper School for the "use of popular art to promote and advance human worth and dignity." 
In 2003, McDuffie was awarded the Humanitas Prize in Children's Animation for the "Jimmy" episode of Static Shock, about gun violence.
In both 2003 and 2004, McDuffie was nominated, with other Static Shock creators, for daytime Emmy awards.
In 2005, he was nominated for the Writers Guild of America award in animation, with Rich Fogel and John Ridley, for the "Starcrossed" episode of Justice League. 
In 2008, McDuffie was voted Favorite Breakout Talent in the Wizard Fan Awards in Wizard Magazine.
In 2009, McDuffie won Comic Con International's Inkpot Award.
In 2011, McDuffie was posthumously awarded the Animation Writers Caucus' annual Animation Writing Award by the Writers Guild of America, West.

Screenwriting
 series head writer denoted in bold

Television
 Static Shock (2000-2004): season 4 head writer
 What’s New, Scooby-Doo? (2002)
 Justice League (2002-2004): season 2 head writer
 Teen Titans (2004)
 Justice League Unlimited (2004-2006)
Ben 10: Alien Force (2008–2010)
Ben 10: Ultimate Alien (2010–2012)
Ben 10: Omniverse (2012)

Films
 Justice League: Crisis on Two Earths (2010)
 All-Star Superman (2011)
 Justice League: Doom (2012)

Bibliography

Regular writer
 "Overture" (in Marvel Comics Presents #19, Marvel Comics, May 1989)
Damage Control (4-issue limited series, Marvel Comics, May–Aug. 1989)
Captain Marvel Giant-Sized Special (one-shot, Marvel Comics, Nov. 1989)
The Sensational She-Hulk in Ceremony (2-issue miniseries, Marvel Comics, 1989)
Giant Size Special Captain Marvel (one-shot, Marvel Comics, Nov. 1989)
Avengers Spotlight #26–29 (Marvel Comics, December 1989 – February 1990)
Damage Control vol. 2 (4-issue limited series, Marvel Comics, December 1989 – February 1990)
The Amazing Spider-Man: Children Special #1–3 (Marvel Comics [Canada], 1990)
Deathlok #1–4 (4-issue limited series, Marvel Comics, July–October 1990)
"The Road to Hell" (with co-author Matt Wayne and art by Colin MacNeil, in Toxic! #30–31, 1991)
Monster in My Pocket #1–4 (Harvey Comics, May–Sept. 1991)
Damage Control vol. 3 (4-issue limited series, Marvel Comics, June 1991 – September 1991)
Prince: Alter Ego (one-shot, DC Comics(Piranha Music, 1991))
Deathlok vol. 2, #1–5,  #11–16, annual #1 (Marvel Comics, July–Nov. 1991, May–Oct. 1992)
Prince: Three Chains of Gold (one-shot, DC Comics (Piranha Music, 1992))
Double Dragon #1–4 (Marvel Comics, July–Oct. 1991)
 "Rest and Sweet Glory" (in Marvel Comics Presents #113–118, Marvel Comics, 1992)
The Demon #26–29 (DC Comics, August–November 1992)
Back to the Future: Forward to the Future #1–3 (Harvey Comics, Oct. 1992 – Jan. 1993)
Blood Syndicate #1–4 (Milestone Comics, April–July 1993)
Hardware #1–8,10–19, 25, 29–32 (DC Comics [Milestone], April 1993 – Oct. 1995)
Icon #1–10,13,15–17,19–31,34–36,38–42 (DC Comics [Milestone], May 1993 – Feb.1997)
Static #1–4 (DC Comics [Milestone], June–Sept. 1993)
Shadow Cabinet #0 (co-author, DC Comics [Milestone], Jan. 1994)
Captain Marvel (one-shot, Marvel Comics, February 1994)
Worlds Collide (one-shot, DC Comics [Milestone], July 1994)
X-O Manowar #17,19–21 (Acclaim Comics, February–June 1998)
Sins of Youth: Kid Flash/Impulse (one-shot, DC Comics, May 2000)
Static Shock! Rebirth of the Cool #1–4 (DC Comics [Milestone], January–September 2001)
Batman: Legends of the Dark Knight #156–158, #164–167 (DC Comics, August–October 2002, April–July 2003)
Fantastic Four Special (one-shot, Marvel Comics, Feb. 2006)
Beyond! (6-issue limited series, Marvel Comics, July–Dec. 2006)
Fantastic Four #542–553 (Marvel Comics)
Justice League of America #13–28, 30-34 (DC Comics, 2007–2009)

Fill-in writer
 "Fall Guy" (co-author, in Solo Avengers #13, Marvel Comics, Dec. 1988)
Clive Barker's Hellraiser #2 (Marvel Comics [Epic], 1989)
St. George #8 (Marvel Comics [Epic], Aug. 1989)
Iron Man #251–252 (Marvel Comics, Dec. 1989 – Jan.1990)
Power Pack #55 (Marvel Comics, April 1990)
Avengers Annual #19 (Marvel Comics, 1990)
Avengers West Coast Annual #5 (Marvel Comics, 1990)
Iron Man Annual #11 (Marvel Comics, 1990)
 "Test Run" (co-author, in Marvel Comics Presents #62, Marvel Comics, Nov. 1990)
 "Shadow of a Doubt" (co-author, in Marvel Super-Heroes vol. 3, #4, Marvel Comics, Dec.1990)
 "Cupid's Arrow"  (in Marvel Super-Heroes vol. 3, #9, Marvel Comics, April 1992)
"Not to Touch the Earth"  (co-author, in Marvel Super-Heroes vol. 3, #11, Marvel Comics, Oct. 1992)
 "Cupid's Error" (co-author, in Marvel Super-Heroes vol. 3, #12, Marvel Comics, Jan.1993)
Clive Barker's Hellraiser #7–10, 15 (Marvel Comics [Epic], 1991–1992)
Hardware #25 (DC Comics [Milestone], March 1995)
"Communications Error." JLA Showcase 80-Page Giant #1 (DC Comics, Feb.1993)
Static #14 (DC Comics [Milestone], Aug. 1994)
Blood Syndicate #35 (DC Comics [Milestone], Feb. 1996)
Impulse #60 (DC Comics, May 2000)
"Never Say Die." Batman: Gotham Knights #27 (DC Comics, May 2002)

Editor
Freddy Kreuger's A Nightmare on Elm Street #1–2 (Marvel Comics, October–November 1989)
Blood Syndicate #1–30 (DC Comics [Milestone], April 1993 – Sept. 1995)
Hardware #1–10 (DC Comics [Milestone], April 1993 – Dec. 1993)
Icon #1–8 (DC Comics [Milestone], May–Dec. 1993)
Static #1–28 (DC Comics [Milestone], June 1993 – Oct. 1995)
Static #30 (DC Comics [Milestone], Dec. 1995)
Shadow Cabinet #0 (DC Comics [Milestone], Jan. 1994)
Xombi #0 (DC Comics [Milestone], Jan. 1994)
Frank (2-issue miniseries, Harvey Comics, March–May 1994)
 "The Call" (in Superman: The Man of Steel #34, DC Comics, June 1994)
Kobalt #1–10 (DC Comics [Milestone], June 1994 – March 1995)
Shadow Cabinet #1–17 (DC Comics [Milestone], June 1994 – Oct. 1995)
Xombi #1–16 (DC Comics [Milestone], June 1994 – Sept. 1995)
Worlds Collide (one-shot, DC Comics [Milestone], July 1994)
Deathwish #1–4 (4-issue limited series, DC Comics [Milestone], Dec. 1994 – March 1995)
My Name is Holocaust #1 (limited series, DC Comics [Milestone], May 1995)
Kobalt #14 (DC Comics [Milestone], Aug. 1995)
Static Shock! Rebirth of the Cool #1–4 (DC Comics [Milestone], January–September 2001)

References

External links
Official website (Archive, 29 Apr 2011)

Dwayne McDuffie Memorial Press Conference". Destinies-The Voice of Science Fiction. Captphil: Online. 2008.
Wayne, Matt (February 27, 2015). "What Dwayne McDuffie Meant To Comics And Why There’s An Award In His Name". Playboy.
Dwayne McDuffie interview at Fantastic Four Headquarters

Writers from Detroit
American comics writers
Comic book editors
African-American writers
African-American comics creators
American comics creators
American television producers
Inkpot Award winners
Tisch School of the Arts alumni
University of Michigan College of Literature, Science, and the Arts alumni
Writers from California
1962 births
2011 deaths